The Water Rights Protection Act is a bill that would prevent federal agencies from requiring certain entities to relinquish their water rights to the United States in order to use public lands.

The bill was introduced into the United States House of Representatives during the 113th United States Congress.

Background

In 2012, a court ruled "in favor of the ski companies... that seizing the privately held water rights usurped state water law." However, the United States Forest Service decided to pursue a "new regulation to demand that water rights be transferred to the federal government as a condition for obtaining permits needed to operate 121 ski resorts that cross over federal lands."

Provisions of the bill
This summary is based largely on the summary provided by the Congressional Research Service, a public domain source.

The Water Rights Protection Act would prohibit the Secretary of the Interior and the Secretary of Agriculture (USDA) from: (1) conditioning the issuance, renewal, amendment, or extension of any permit, approval, license, lease, allotment, easement, right-of-way, or other land use or occupancy agreement on the transfer of any water right directly to the United States, or any impairment in title, in whole or in part, granted or recognized under state law, by federal or state adjudication, decree, or other judgment, or pursuant to any interstate water compact; and (2) requiring any water user to apply for a water right in the name of the United States under state law as a condition of such a land use or occupancy agreement.

The bill would state that nothing in this Act limits or expands any existing authority of the Secretaries to condition any permit, approval, license, lease, allotment, easement, right-of-way, or other land use or occupancy agreement on federal lands subject to their respective jurisdictions.

Congressional Budget Office report
This summary is based largely on the summary provided by the Congressional Budget Office, as ordered reported by the House Committee on Natural Resources on November 14, 2013. This is a public domain source.

H.R. 3189 would prevent federal agencies from requiring certain entities to relinquish their water rights to the United States in order to use public lands. Because Congressional Budget Office (CBO) expects that enacting the bill would not affect the number of users of public lands or the amount of receipts received by federal agencies for the use of those lands, we estimate that enacting the bill would have no impact on the federal budget. Enacting H.R. 3189 would not affect direct spending or revenues; therefore, pay-as-you-go procedures do not apply.

H.R. 3189 contains no intergovernmental or private-sector mandates as defined in the Unfunded Mandates Reform Act and would not affect the budgets of state, local, or tribal governments.

Procedural history

The Water Rights Protection Act was introduced into the United States House of Representatives on September 26, 2013 by Rep. Scott R. Tipton (R, CO-3). The bill was referred to the United States House Committee on Natural Resources, the United States House Committee on Agriculture, the United States House Natural Resources Subcommittee on Water and Power, and the United States House Agriculture Subcommittee on Conservation, Energy, and Forestry. The bill was ordered reported (amended) by the Committee on Natural Resources on March 4, 2014 alongside House Report 113-372 Part 1. On March 7, 2014, House Majority Leader Eric Cantor announced that H.R. 3189 would be considered on March 12 or 13, 2014.

Debate and discussion
The Colorado ski industry supported the bill because it believed the legislation was "needed to block a water extortion scheme by the Forest Service to withhold government permits unless the companies relinquish their valuable water rights." Vice President of the Aspen Skiing Company David Corbin testified to the House Natural Resources Subcommittee on Water and Power that the company would go out of business without the water.

Rep. Tipton, who sponsored the bill, said the bill was needed because it "provides critical protection for water rights' holders from federal takings by ensuring that federal government agencies cannot extort private property rights through uneven-handed negotiations." Tipton argued that the bill "prohibits federal agencies from pilfering water rights through the use of permits, leases, and other land management arrangements, for which it would otherwise have to pay just compensation under the 5th Amendment of the Constitution."

Rep. Tom McClintock (R-CA) also supported the bill, saying that the Forest Service's regulation "illustrates an increasingly hostile attitude by this agency toward those who make productive use of our vast national forests, in this case by enhancing and attracting the tourism upon which our mountain communities depend."

Rep. Jared Huffman (D-CA) accused the House Natural Resources Subcommittee on Water and Power of being unnecessarily "adversarial" and having "unfairly vilified" the Forest Service after a committee hearing about the bill.

The Public Lands Council and the National Cattlemen's Beef Association both supported the bill and urged supporters to contact their representatives and encourage them to vote in favor of the bill.

The bill was opposed by groups likes the Sierra Club, the Natural Resources Defense Council, and the National Parks Conservation Association. Over 60 "conservation, sportsman, and recreation groups" opposed the bill. According to opponents, the bill is too broad. They believe the bill "could also block federal fisheries agencies like the United States Fish and Wildlife Service from requiring flows that help salmon find fish ladders and safely pass over dams."

American Whitewater opposed the bill, calling it a "sneak attack designed to force federal agencies to put private uses of river water ahead of other beneficial public uses like fish, wildlife, and recreation."

See also
List of bills in the 113th United States Congress

Notes/References

External links

Library of Congress - Thomas H.R. 3189
beta.congress.gov H.R. 3189
GovTrack.us H.R. 3189
OpenCongress.org H.R. 3189
WashingtonWatch.com H.R. 3189
Congressional Budget Office's report on H.R. 3189

United States proposed federal environmental legislation
Proposed legislation of the 113th United States Congress
Proposed legislation of the 114th United States Congress
Proposed legislation of the 115th United States Congress
Proposed legislation of the 116th United States Congress
Proposed legislation of the 117th United States Congress
Water resource management in the United States